Garbán mac Éndai (flourished 596) was a King of Munster from the Eóganacht Áine branch of the Eoganachta and appears as the first king from this branch with his brother Amalgaid mac Éndai. The chronology of the Munster kings from this period is confusing. The Annals of Tigernach mention him as king in 596 along with his brother Amalgaid and he is mentioned as king in The Book of Leinster. However, the pro-Glendamnach Laud Synchronisms omit him as does the saga of Senchas Fagbála Caisil "The Story of the Finding of Cashel".

See also
Kings of Munster

Notes

References

Annals of Tigernach
Francis J.Byrne, Irish Kings and High-Kings 
Book of Leinster,{MS folio 150a} Fland cecinit.
Laud Synchronisms
The Chronology of the Irish Annals, Daniel P. McCarthy

External links
CELT: Corpus of Electronic Texts at University College Cork

Kings of Munster
6th-century Irish monarchs
7th-century Irish monarchs